Heart Lake 167A is an Indian reserve of the Heart Lake First Nation in Alberta, located within Lac La Biche County.

References

Indian reserves in Alberta
Cree reserves and territories